Tang-e Quchan (also Romanized as Tang-e Qūchān and Tang Qūchān; also known as Tang-e Sefīd) is a village in Golestan Rural District, in the Central District of Sirjan County, Kerman Province, Iran. At the 2006 census, its population was 27, in 5 families.

References 

Populated places in Sirjan County